The Karakoram is a mountain range in Kashmir region spanning the borders of Pakistan, China, and India,  with the northwest extremity of the range extending to Afghanistan and Tajikistan. Most of the Karakoram mountain range falls under the jurisdiction of Gilgit-Baltistan, which is controlled by Pakistan. Its highest peak (and world's second-highest), K2, is located in Gilgit-Baltistan. It begins in the Wakhan Corridor (Afghanistan) in the west, encompasses the majority of Gilgit-Baltistan, and extends into Ladakh (controlled by India) and Aksai Chin (controlled by China). It is the second-highest mountain range in the world and part of the complex of ranges including the Pamir Mountains, the Hindu Kush and the Himalayan Mountains.

The Karakoram is bounded on the east by the Aksai Chin plateau, on the northeast by the edge of the Tibetan Plateau and on the north by the river valleys of the Yarkand and Karakash rivers beyond which lie the Kunlun Mountains. At the northwest corner are the Pamir Mountains. The southern boundary of the Karakoram is formed, west to east, by the Gilgit, Indus and Shyok rivers, which separate the range from the northwestern end of the Himalaya range proper. These rivers flow northwest before making an abrupt turn southwestward towards the plains of Pakistan. Roughly in the middle of the Karakoram range is the Karakoram Pass, which was part of a historic trade route between Ladakh and Yarkand that is now inactive.

The Tashkurghan National Nature Reserve and the Pamir Wetlands National Nature Reserve in the Karalorun and Pamir mountains have been nominated for inclusion in UNESCO in 2010 by the National Commission of the People's Republic of China for UNESCO and has tentatively been added to the list.

Name 

Karakoram is a Turkic term meaning black gravel. The Central Asian traders originally applied the name to the Karakoram Pass. Early European travellers, including William Moorcroft and George Hayward, started using the term for the range of mountains west of the pass, although they also used the term Muztagh (meaning, "Ice Mountain") for the range now known as Karakoram. Later terminology was influenced by the Survey of India, whose surveyor Thomas Montgomerie in the 1850s gave the labels K1 to K6 (K for Karakoram) to six high mountains visible from his station at Mount Haramukh in Kashmir Valley.

In traditional Indian geography the mountains were known as Krishnagiri (black mountains), Kanhagiri and Kanheri.

Exploration 
Due to its altitude and ruggedness, the Karakoram is much less inhabited than parts of the Himalayas further east.  European explorers first visited early in the 19th century, followed by British surveyors starting in 1856.

The Muztagh Pass was crossed in 1887 by the expedition of Colonel Francis Younghusband and the valleys above the Hunza River were explored by General Sir George K. Cockerill in 1892.  Explorations in the 1910s and 1920s established most of the geography of the region.

The name Karakoram was used in the early 20th century, for example by Kenneth Mason, for the range now known as the Baltoro Muztagh.  The term is now used to refer to the entire range from the Batura Muztagh above Hunza in the west to the Saser Muztagh in the bend of the Shyok River in the east.

Floral surveys were carried out in the Shyok River catchment and from Panamik to Turtuk village by Chandra Prakash Kala during 1999 and 2000.

Geology and glaciers 

The Karakoram is in one of the world's most geologically active areas, at the plate boundary between the Indo-Australian plate and the Eurasian plate.
Mountain glaciers may serve as an indicator of climate change, advancing and receding with long-term changes in temperature and precipitation. The Karakoram glaciers are slightly retreating, unlike the Himalayas where glaciers are losing mass at significantly higher rate, many Karakoram glaciers are covered in a layer of rubble which insulates the ice from the warmth of the sun. Where there is no such insulation, the rate of retreat is high.

 Siachen Glacier
 Baltoro Glacier
 Hispar Glacier
 Batura Glacier
 Biafo Glacier
 Chogo Lungma Glacier
 Yinsugaiti Glacier

Ice Age 
In the last ice age, a connected series of glaciers stretched from western Tibet to Nanga Parbat, and from the Tarim basin to the Gilgit District. To the south, the Indus glacier was the main valley glacier, which flowed  down from Nanga Parbat massif to  elevation.

During the Ice Age, the glacier snowline was about  lower than today.

Highest peaks 

The highest peaks of the Karakoram are:

The majority of the highest peaks are in the Gilgit–Baltistan region administered by Pakistan. Baltistan has more than 100 mountain peaks exceeding  height from sea level.

K-numbers

Subranges 

The naming and division of the various subranges of the Karakoram is not universally agreed upon. However, the following is a list of the most important subranges, following Jerzy Wala. The ranges are listed roughly west to east.

 Batura Muztagh
 Rakaposhi-Haramosh Mountains
 Spantik-Sosbun Mountains
 Hispar Muztagh
 South Ghujerab Mountains
 Panmah Muztagh
 Wesm Mountains
 Masherbrum Mountains
 Baltoro Muztagh
 Saltoro Mountains
 Siachen Muztagh
 Rimo Muztagh
 Saser Muztagh

Passes 

Passes from west to east are:
 Dandala Pass is the most important and earlier pass. It starts from Ghursay saitang city to Yarqand in China. It is the main trade route between Khaplu, Ladakh, Kharmang to Yarqand, China.
 Kilik Pass
 Mintaka Pass
 Khunjerab Pass (the highest paved international border crossing at )
 Shimshal Pass
 Mustagh Pass
 Karakoram Pass
 Sasser Pass
 Naltar Pass or Pakora Pass

The Khunjerab Pass is the only motorable pass across the range. The Shimshal Pass (which does not cross an international border) is the only other pass still in regular use.

Cultural references 
The Karakoram mountain range has been referred to in a number of novels and movies. Rudyard Kipling refers to the Karakoram mountain range in his novel Kim, which was first published in 1900. Marcel Ichac made a film titled Karakoram, chronicling a French expedition to the range in 1936. The film won the Silver Lion at the Venice Film Festival of 1937. Greg Mortenson details the Karakoram, and specifically K2 and the Balti, extensively in his book Three Cups of Tea, about his quest to build schools for children in the region. K2 Kahani (The K2 Story) by Mustansar Hussain Tarar describes his experiences at K2 base camp.

See also 
 Karakoram Highway
 List of mountain ranges of the world
 List of highest mountains (a list of mountains above )
 Mount Imeon
 Naltar Valley
 Trans-Karakoram Tract

References

Citations

Sources 

 Curzon, George Nathaniel. 1896. The Pamirs and the Source of the Oxus. Royal Geographical Society, London. Reprint: Elibron Classics Series, Adamant Media Corporation. 2005.  (pbk);  (hbk).
 Kipling, Rudyard 2002. Kim (novel); ed. by Zohreh T. Sullivan. New York: W. W. Norton & Company. —This is the most extensive critical modern edition with footnotes, essays, maps, etc.
 Mortenson, Greg and Relin, David Oliver. 2008. Three Cups of Tea. Penguin Books Ltd.  (pbk); Viking Books  (hbk); Tantor Media  (MP3 CD).
 Kreutzmann, Hermann, Karakoram in Transition: Culture, Development, and Ecology in the Hunza Valley, Oxford, Oxford University Press, 2006. .

Further reading
 Dainelli, G. (1932). A Journey to the Glaciers of the Eastern Karakoram. The Geographical Journal, 79(4), 257–268.

External links 

 Blankonthemap The Northern Kashmir Website
 Pakistan's Northern Areas dilemma
 Great Karakorams – images on Flickr

 
Mountain ranges of Afghanistan
Landforms of Badakhshan Province
Mountain ranges of Pakistan
Mountain ranges of Gilgit-Baltistan
Mountain ranges of India
Mountains of Ladakh
Mountain ranges of China
Mountain ranges of Xinjiang
Sites along the Silk Road
Turkic words and phrases